Swimming was contested at the 2015 Summer Universiade from July 4 to 11 in Gwangju, South Korea. The swimming competitions was held at the Nambu University International Aquatics Center.

Medal summary

Medal table

Men's events

 Swimmers who participated in the heats only and received medals.

Women's events

References

External links
Results book

2015 in swimming
Swimming at the Summer Universiade
2015 Summer Universiade events